Robert Ferguson (born April quarter 1908, date of death unknown) was an English professional footballer who played as an inside forward. He played a single match in the Football League for Nelson. His brother, Ted, also played football for Nelson and Ashington.

References

1908 births
Year of death missing
English footballers
Association football forwards
Ashington A.F.C. players
West Bromwich Albion F.C. players
Blyth Spartans A.F.C. players
Annfield Plain F.C. players
Nelson F.C. players
English Football League players
Jarrow F.C. players